Akpawfu (or Akpofu) is a town in Nkanu East Local Government Area of Enugu State, Nigeria.

It is made up of three autonomous communities: Obodo Uvuru, Isiagu and Ajame-agu.

The traditional ruler of Obodo Uvuru is Igwe Dume Nnamoko (Uvuru 1 of Obodo Uvuru) while the traditional ruler of Ajame-agu is Igwe Christopher O. Nnamani (Amaeze 1 of Ajame-Amaeze).

It has two main streams: Iyaba and Etavu. Akpawfu is bordered by Amagunze, Akpugo and Oruku.

About 90% of the populace are literate, 95% of the communities are Christians. It central success is figured in agricultural productions. It has an estimated population of 150,000. 

Akpawfu has Ovu lake which is perhaps the largest lake in Enugu state.
Other lakes in Akpawfu include: Offia lake, Ururo-naka lake and Ururo-ode lake.

References

Geography of Nigeria